Howard Elliott (June 29, 1904 – May 22, 1985) was an American lawyer and Republican politician from Missouri.

Elliott was born in Ladue, Missouri in 1904.  He attended Columbia University and received his law degree from Washington University in St. Louis.

Political career
He was elected to the Missouri House of Representatives in 1936, and served as a representative from Ladue from 1937 to 1953.  During his time as representative, he served as the Speaker of the Missouri House of Representatives from 1943 to 1947.

Howard Elliott chose not to stand for re-election to the legislature in favor of running for governor of Missouri in the 1952 election.  He easily won the Republican primary, but was then defeated in the general election by former Governor Phil M. Donnelly.

References 

Politicians from St. Louis County, Missouri
Republican Party members of the Missouri House of Representatives
Speakers of the Missouri House of Representatives
1904 births
1985 deaths
20th-century American politicians
Columbia University alumni
Washington University School of Law alumni